Zhu Lin was the defending champion, but lost in the semifinals to Han Xinyun.

Han won the title, defeating Duan Yingying in the final, 4–6, 6–2, 6–2.

Seeds

Draw

Finals

Top half

Bottom half

References

Main Draw

Jin'an Open - Singles
Jin'an Open